Nikki Kidd (born 14 August 1987 in Buckie) is a female field hockey forward from Scotland. She plays club hockey for Bonagrass Grove, and made her debut for the Women's National Team in 2006. Kidd, a resident of Longside, attended Mintlaw Academy where she was a national level middle distance runner, and had football trials for Scotland at U15 level before focusing solely on hockey.

References
 sportscotland

1987 births
Living people
Scottish female field hockey players
Field hockey players at the 2006 Commonwealth Games
People from Buckie
Field hockey players at the 2014 Commonwealth Games
Sportspeople from Moray
Commonwealth Games competitors for Scotland